The midaidokoro (御台所) was the official wife of the shōgun. During the Edo period, she resided in the Ōoku of Edo Castle and sometimes wielded considerable political power behind the scenes.

Heian period
 Miyoshi Takako, wife of Sakanoue no Tamuramaro and daughter of Miyoshi Kiyotsugu
 Tomoe Gozen, wife of Minamoto no Yoshinaka and daughter of Nakahara Kaneto

Kamakura period
 Hōjō Masako, daughter of Hōjō Tokimasa, wife of Minamoto no Yoritomo and mother of Minamoto no Yoriie and Minamoto no Sanetomo
 Wakasa no Tsubone (d.1203), daughter of Hiki Yoshikazu and wife of Minamoto no Yoriie also mother of Take no Gosho (wife of Kujo Yoritsune)
 Bomon Nobuko (1193-1274), daughter of Bomon Nobukiyo and wife of Minamoto no Sanetomo
 Minamoto no Yoshiko or Take no Gosho (1202–1234), daughter of second shōgun Minamoto no Yoriie with Wakasa no Tsubone and wife of Kujo Yoritsune
 Hiwadahime (1230–1247), daughter of Hojo Tokiuji and wife of Kujo Yoritsugu
 Konoe Saiko (b. 1241), daughter of Konoe Kanetsune, wife of Prince Munetaka and mother of Prince Koreyasu
 daughter of Prince Koreyasu, wife of Prince Hisaaki and mother of Prince Morikuni died in 1306.

Nanbokucho period
 daughter of Kitabatake Moronaga and wife of Prince Moriyoshi

Muromachi period
 Akahashi Toshi (1306–1365), wife of Ashikaga Takauji and mother of Ashikaga Yoshiakira
 Shibukawa Koshi (1332–1392), daughter of Shibukawa Yoshisue and wife of Ashikaga Yoshiakira
 Hino Nariko (1351–1405), wife of Ashikaga Yoshimitsu and daughter of Hino Tokimitsu
 Hino Eiko (1390–1431), wife of Ashikaga Yoshimochi, daughter of Hino Motoyasu and mother of Ashikaga Yoshikazu
 Hino Muneko (d. 1447), wife of Ashikaga Yoshinori and daughter of Hino Shigemitsu
  Hino Tomiko, wife of Ashikaga Yoshimasa, daughter of Hino Shigemasa and mother of Ashikaga Yoshihisa
 Shōun'in, wife of Ashikaga Yoshihisa and daughter of Hino Katsumitsu
 Seiyun'in, daughter of Hosokawa Shigeyuki and wife of Ashikaga Yoshitane
 Hino Akiko, daughter of Hino Nagatoshi, wife of Ashikaga Yoshizumi and mother of Ashikaga Yoshiharu
 Keijuin (1514–1565), daughter of Konoe Hisamichi, wife of Ashikaga Yoshiharu and mother of Ashikaga Yoshiteru and Ashikaga Yoshiaki
 daughter of Konoe Taneie and wife of Ashikaga Yoshiteru
 Yuki no Tsubone, wife of Ashikaga Yoshihide

Edo period
 Oeyo, daughter of Azai Nagamasa, wife of Tokugawa Hidetada and mother of Tokugawa Iemitsu
 Takatsukasa Takako (1622–1683) later Honriin, wife of Tokugawa Iemitsu and daughter of Takatsukasa Nobufusa
 Asa no Miya Akiko (1640–1676) later Koke'in, wife of Tokugawa Ietsuna and daughter of Fushimi no Miya Sadakiyo
 Takatsukasa Nobuko (1651–1709) later Tenjoin, wife of Tokugawa Tsunayoshi and daughter of Takatsukasa Norihira
 Konoe Hiroko (1666–1741) later Ten-ei'in, wife of Tokugawa Ienobu and daughter of Konoe Motohiro
 Yasonomiya Yoshiko Naishinno later Jorin'in-no-Miya (1714-1758), wife of Tokugawa Ietsugu and daughter of Emperor Reigen
 Iso no Miya Tomoko later Haisen'in (1738–1771), wife of Tokugawa Ieharu and daughter of Kan'in no Miya Naohito Shinno
 Shimazu no Shigehime or Tadakohime (1773–1844) later Kodai-in, wife of Tokugawa Ienari and daughter of Shimazu Shigehide of Satsuma Domain
 Arisugawa Takako (1795–1840) later Jokan-in, wife of Tokugawa Ieyoshi and daughter of Prince Arisugawa Orihito
 Shimazu Atsuhime or Fujiwara no Sumiko, later Tenshoin, wife of Tokugawa Iesada and daughter of Shimazu Tadatake (1806-1854), adopted daughter of Shimazu Nariakira and Konoe Tadahiro
 Chikako, Princess Kazu, later Seikan'in-no-miya, wife of Tokugawa Iemochi and daughter of Emperor Ninkō

The first Midaidokoro in this period was wife of the second shōgun, Tokugawa Hidetada, because when the Tokugawa Ieyasu became shōgun his wives had already died so there was no Midaidokoro at that time. When Tokugawa Yoshimune's time came he didn't have Midaidokoro either because his wife had died before he became shōgun. Also when Tokugawa Ieshige's time, his wife already died. At Tokugawa Yoshinobu's time he and his wife doesn't enter Edo castle but they entered Nijo castle so his wife was called "Gorenju".

See also 
 Ōmidaidokoro
 Mandokoro
 seishitsu

References

Marriage, unions and partnerships in Japan
Japanese historical terms
Feudal Japan
Japanese words and phrases
Wives of national leaders